Nuclear escalation is the concept of a large conflict escalating from conventional warfare to nuclear warfare.

Possible solutions

NATO policies preventing nuclear escalation

Background 

The North Atlantic Treaty Organization (NATO) is an intergovernmental military alliance. Because three of its members (the United States, the United Kingdom, and France) are nuclear powers, the alliance also serves as a nuclear power. NATO was formed during the Cold War to provide security for its member states and assure mutual destruction with the Soviet Union. While three of NATO's member states are armed with nuclear weapons, the United States has the largest nuclear arsenal.

Though NATO had policies regarding the escalation surrounding nuclear war, they largely did not take effect until the late 1950s. This was because, while the Soviet Union lacked intercontinental ballistic missiles and other long-range missiles to directly threaten the United States, the US had stationed missile launchers within European NATO member states. This gave the US an advantage should nuclear war commence. After this time period, however, the Soviet Union was able to amass a large-enough nuclear stockpile to allow it to effectively target the US. As the US would be met with a similar or greater nuclear threat than they posed to the Soviet Union, they introduced the NATO response policy of "massive retaliation," which focused on the commitment to retaliate with a greater force than they had been attacked with.

Because of the geographical position of European nations, they would quickly become involved in any war between superpowers, even if it did not originate in Europe. The possible conflict between members of the Soviet Union led-Warsaw Pact and members of the United States led-NATO would likely escalate from conventional warfare to nuclear warfare. As most of Europe were involved in either NATO or the Warsaw Pact, they would be engulfed in any war that arose from a conflict between the two. This made European NATO member states a target if the Cold War were to escalate into a nuclear war.

Policies 

NATO has several policies that are used to prevent nuclear escalation and nuclear war in NATO territory. The first policy, horizontal escalation, involves attempting to relocate the war to an area outside the European continent. The second policy, temporal escalation, consists of prolonging conventional warfare until neither side can continue the war effort, causing a stalemate. However, as seen in wars similar to World War II, wars can last several years and still involve nuclear weaponry. Surprise escalation, the third policy, involves attempting to prevent the opposing nation from initiating a nuclear war. 

NATO began to evolve from its previous policies and devise a plan suggested to it by the United States called ‘flexible response.’ By NATO reasoning in the face of an all-out USSR invasion of Europe, the U.S. still guaranteed strategic help, and a USSR invasion, would upset the balance of world powers and force the U.S. to enter due to its many international interests that would be jeopardized. 

The ‘Flexible response’ policy laid out a plan for NATO in which it would develop a capacity to respond to any form of USSR aggression without help from the U.S. until all forms of action were taken: battlefield, conventional, theater, or Nuclear weapons. European NATO members quickly let known the great cost required for the ‘flexible position,’ which is what they were avoiding in the 1950s when the proposal for a large ground force for NATO had been suggested.  

The policy of ‘Flexible Response’ was met with doubt from some Europeans. The U.S. guaranteed the defense of NATO nations if NATO battlefield strategy and theater strategy fail in the face of an attack from the USSR, but some Europeans contended that the intermediate steps of 'Flexible Response' were superfluous.  

The Europeans who raised this argument believed that the previous 'massive retaliation' stance, in which the U.S. was more than willing to respond to any attack with nuclear weapons if the USSR even thought about attacking any NATO member, was the better course of action due to it unfolding from a small conflict to a war of two superpowers.  These doubts within the smaller NATO countries would come to fruition when France quit believing in the past NATO ideology that heralded the U.S. as a martyr in which they would engulf their entire country in the war for its allies in Europe. This led to the creation of France's own nuclear defense program, and France would withdraw from NATO's integrated military structure.

In 1967 NATO officially accepted the doctrine of ‘Flexible Response,’ but the European members' anxieties towards it were exacerbated by changing how the policy was implemented. The first proposed change was to create a larger conventional standing force; if destroyed, the U.S. would then respond in kind to the USSR with nuclear weapons. This change was not fully implemented. NATO did not increase its conventional force size and, by not doing so, they retained a meager standing military that could be annihilated by the USSR in moments. This policy, after the Europeans amalgamated it, allowed them to retain the previous defense employed. NATO forces were insignificant, but the U.S. nuclear might was superior and it created the deterrence they sought at the time.  To further increase deterrence, NATO adopted dual capable missile systems, such as 155mm artillery. It allowed for the delivery of either a conventional payload or a nuclear one. This was not done only for the simplicity of ordnance, but as a sign to any USSR aggression that they were prepared to use nuclear weapons given to them. 

NATO had a good foundation of nuclear weapons provided by the U.S. and a small amount by Britain. They possessed 1,081 155mm artillery, 319 203  mm artillery, 90 Lance missiles, 91 Honest John missiles, and 180 Pershing 1A missiles that were all nuclear-capable with allocated nuclear payloads. In 1974 France created the Pluton, an all-French tactical missile, and made it available to NATO. It was a fully mobile, accurate missile with the capability to deliver a 25-kiloton bomb for attacking rear areas, or a smaller 15-kiloton bomb designed to destroy advancing troops. By 1981, over 30 Pluton units were deployed with available reloads accompanying them throughout Europe.  NATO's battlefield deterrence was not the bulk of its later capabilities in the 1980s. NATO also possessed a large number of nuclear-capable aircraft that could be used in multiple roles, nuclear and non-nuclear, within a conflict.

See also
 Nuclear weapons debate

References

Works cited
 
 
 

Politics of NATO
Geopolitical rivalry
Nuclear warfare
Cold War